Ibrahim Fejić (1879 – 15 December 1962) was a Bosnian Muslim theologian who served as the mayor of Mostar from 1929 until 1934 and as Grand Mufti of the Yugoslav Islamic Community from 1947 until 1957. He is most remembered for his endorsement of the campaign against the veiling of Muslim women.

Early career
Ibrahim Fejić was born into a prominent Bosniak family in the Herzegovinian town of Mostar, then part of the Austro-Hungarian Condominium of Bosnia and Herzegovina, where he attended primary school and madrasah and received his ijazah. He was fluent in Turkish, Arabic and Persian, and had a working command of German language.

Fejić functioned as theology teacher and publicist in his hometown. In 1920 he entered the ulema of the majlis in Sarajevo, and in 1929 he was elected mayor of Mostar, by then part of the Kingdom of Yugoslavia. During World War II, following the Nazi occupation of Yugoslavia, Fejić stood with the Yugoslav Partisans, took an active part in the resistance movement and denounced the Holocaust and the persecution of Serbs and the Romani people.

Religious leadership
The end of World War II saw the Partisans as victors in Yugoslavia. The Communist Party of Yugoslavia took power and in 1947 reached an accord with the Islamic Community, requiring the election of reformist leaders. In August a new constitution of the Islamic Community was promulgated, with Fejić being elected the first grand mufti (reisu-l-ulema) in the "Second Yugoslavia" on 26 August. The ceremonial inauguration took place on 12 September in the Gazi Husrev-beg Mosque rather than the Emperor's Mosque, as had been traditional.

In the year of Fejić's inauguration, with the aim of accelerating the emancipation of women, the Women's Antifascist Front of Bosnia and Herzegovina launched a campaign against the wearing of hijab and niqāb (zar, the face veil). Already in his inaugural address Grand Mufti Fejić voiced his support of the campaign, stating: "One valuable legacy of the liberation war of our peoples is the proclamation of women's equality. But unfortunately women cannot achieve the full expression of that equality, as they are inhibited by wearing the veil and gown." On 1 November the Islamic Community declared that "the veiling of women is not required by religious code. Muslim women, as regards religion, are free to walk about unveiled and tend to their affairs." In 1950, Fejić published a text in which he further explained that veiling the face was not mandated by the religion.

Death
In November 1957, Fejić requested that he be relieved of his office. He died on 15 December 1962, and was buried two days later in Sarajevo.

References

|-

1879 births
1962 deaths
People from Mostar
Bosnia and Herzegovina imams
Bosniaks of Bosnia and Herzegovina
Mayors of Mostar
Grand Muftis of Yugoslavia